Nemwang is a Nepalese surname. Notable people with that surname include:
Subaschandra Nemwang, Nepalese politician and the former chairman of Constituent Assembly of Nepal.
Basanta Kumar Nemwang, Nepalese politician.
Til Bikram Nembang, Nepalese senior litterateur.

Surnames of Nepalese origin